Le Magnifique (literally The Magnificent; also known as The Man from Acapulco) is a French/Italian international co-production released in 1973, starring Jean-Paul Belmondo, Jacqueline Bisset and Vittorio Caprioli that was directed by Philippe de Broca. Le Magnifique is a slapstick spoof of B-series espionage films and novels and the men who write them.

Synopsis
François Merlin (Jean-Paul Belmondo) is a Jean Bruce type writer of pulp espionage novels (he has written 42 so far) and about half of the film plays in his imagination, where he is the world-renowned superspy "Bob Sinclar" (The name of the character is never seen written in the film, while some people write his name "Saint-Clair" the way it is pronounced in French sounds like Sinclar; in the English dubbed soundtrack the surname is "St. Cloud".)

Christine (Jacqueline Bisset) is a sociology student who lives in François' building and is interested in the novels, but in the writer's imagination she becomes Tatiana, his paramour, while the pompous and rich publisher of his novels, Pierre Charron (Vittorio Caprioli), doubles as the great villain of the spy novels, the Albanian secret services head Karpov, who in a memorable scene of the film threatens to cut off one of Tatiana's breasts.

Christine is clearly fascinated with the handsome spy Bob Sinclar, an unrealistic and idealised hero, who is the very opposite of his creator: a clumsy, frustrated divorced man who barely makes enough money to get by. However, when she is befriended by the rich and vain publisher who looks down upon his poor hack writer, she realises her mistake, and after a party where he tries to seduce her, she flees him and falls asleep on the landing outside the writer's flat, where he finds her in the morning, clad apparently only in a T-shirt and embraces her for a happy ending. In the final scene, François throws over the balcony his last manuscript, freeing himself from his character and his imaginary life.

Production
Due to a dispute between Francis Veber and director Philippe de Broca over the importance of the lead female character to the script, Francis Veber refused to be credited as a writer. As a result, the credits don't feature any writer.

UK Release
In the United Kingdom, Le Magnifique was titled How to Destroy the Reputation of the Greatest Secret Agent, and was released as the B-Movie to the film Doc Savage: The Man of Bronze in 1975.

Cast 
 Jean-Paul Belmondo : François Merlin / Bob Saint-Clar
 Jacqueline Bisset : Christine / Tatiana
 Vittorio Caprioli : Georges Charron / Colonel Karpof
  : Mrs. Berger
 Mario David (actor) : Policeman
 Raymond Gérôme : General Pontaubert
 Jean Lefebvre : The electrician
 Hans Meyer : Colonel Collins
 André Weber : The plumber
 Hubert Deschamps : Salesman
 Bernard Musson : Interpreter
  : Interpreter
  : The Lecturer
  : Doctor

References to other films and media

This is the film that is the main inspiration for the three teenage heroes of the novel by Andrei Makine, Once Upon the River Love (Au temps du fleuve Amour, 1994).

French DJ Bob Sinclar took his stage name from the unseen super spy.

Notes

External links

Le Magnifique at Le Film Guide

1973 films
Films about writers
French spy comedy films
Italian spy comedy films
Films directed by Philippe de Broca
1970s action comedy films
1970s spy comedy films
French parody films
French action comedy films
Films with screenplays by Jean-Paul Rappeneau
1973 comedy films
Parody films based on James Bond films
Films scored by Claude Bolling
Films set in a fictional country
1970s Italian films
1970s French films
Films with screenplays by Francis Veber